The following is a list of North Indian Ocean tropical cyclones from 1930 to 1939. Records from before the 1970s were extremely unreliable, and storms that stayed at sea were often only reported by ship reports.

1930
May 2–7, 1930 – A cyclonic storm existed over the southern Bay of Bengal.
May 10–13, 1930 – A cyclonic storm existed over the northern Bay of Bengal.
June 14–16, 1930 – A shallow depression existed over the northeastern Bay of Bengal.
June 20–23, 1930 – A depression existed over the southeastern Arabian Sea.
June 27–30, 1930 – A cyclonic storm existed over the eastern Arabian Sea.
June 28 – July 1, 1930 – A cyclonic storm existed over the eastern Bay of Bengal.
July 8–10, 1930 – A shallow depression existed over the northern Bay of Bengal.
July 11–13, 1930 – A cyclonic storm existed over the northern Bay of Bengal.
July 21–24, 1930 – A depression existed over the northern Bay of Bengal.
September 6–8, 1930 – A depression existed over the Andaman Sea.

1937 
A Tropical Depression struck Maharashtra

See also
 1930s Australian region cyclone seasons
 1900–1940 South Pacific cyclone seasons
 1900–1950 South-West Indian Ocean cyclone seasons
Atlantic hurricane seasons: 1930, 1931, 1932, 1933, 1934, 1935, 1936, 1937, 1938, 1939
Eastern Pacific hurricane seasons: 1930, 1931, 1932, 1933, 1934, 1935, 1936, 1937, 1938, 1939
Western Pacific typhoon seasons: 1930, 1931, 1932, 1933, 1934, 1935, 1936, 1937, 1938, 1939

References

North Indian Ocean cyclone seasons
North Indian Ocean cyclone